Kalikasthan is a village in Achham District in the Seti Zone of western Nepal. At the time of the 1991 Nepal census, the village had a population of 2675 living in 508 houses. At the time of the 2001 Nepal census, the population was 3476, of which 32% was literate. The village is undeveloped, although in recent years local villagers have become aware of outside conditions and are engaging in communal-based local development. It's one of the more peaceful villages of Nepal.

References

Populated places in Achham District
Village development committees in Achham District